Mary Patricia Nevill, Marchioness of Abergavenny  (20 October 1915 – 22 February 2005) was a friend and Lady of the Bedchamber to Elizabeth II.

Life
She was born Mary Patricia Harrison, the daughter of John Harrison of King’s Walden, and his wife, Hon. Margaret Harrison,  a daughter of William Levy-Lawson, 3rd Baron Burnham.

On 4 January 1938, she married the John Nevill, Earl of Lewes, who inherited his father's title of Marquess of Abergavenny in 1954, whereupon Patricia became Marchioness of Abergavenny. They had five children:
 Lady Anne Patricia Nevill (b. 25 October 1938), married Captain Martin Whiteley and had issue.
 Lady Vivienne Margaret Nevill (15 February 1941 – 10 September 2018), married Alan Lillingston and had issue.
 Lady Jane Elizabeth Nevill (1944–1946), died in infancy.
 Henry John Montague Nevill, Earl of Lewes (1948–1965), educated at Eton, died without issue.
 Lady Rose Nevill (b. 15 July 1950); a bridesmaid at the wedding of Princess Margaret and Antony Armstrong-Jones. Lady Rose married George Clowes and had issue.

In 1960 it was suggested to her father (who lived at King's Walden and was a neighbour to the Strathmores' home of St. Paul's Walden Bury) that she become an Extra Lady of the Bedchamber to the Queen; and she held this position from 1960 to 1966. She then became a full Lady of the Bedchamber from 1966 until her retirement in 1987, when she reverted to an Extra Lady until her death.

Death
The Marchioness of Abergavenny died on 22 February 2005, aged 89.

Honours
In 1970, Lady Abergavenny was appointed CVO and in 1981 DCVO. In 1969, she received the Grand Decoration in Gold with Star for Services to the Republic of Austria.

Notes

1915 births
2005 deaths
British marchionesses
Dames Commander of the Royal Victorian Order
Ladies of the Bedchamber
Recipients of the Grand Decoration with Star for Services to the Republic of Austria